Tenggerese may refer to:
 Tenggerese dialect, a dialect of the Javanese language spoken in Java, Indonesia
 Tenggerese people, a sub-ethnicity of the Javanese people from Indonesia